Clasina Cornelia "Cor" Kint (22 July 1920, Rotterdam – 7 October 2002, Coffs Harbour, Australia) was a Dutch backstroke swimmer who won the gold medal at the 1938 European Aquatics Championships. Between 1938 and 1940 she was three times national champion in the 100 m backstroke and set five world records and four European records in the 100 m, 200 m, 100 yd and 150 yd backstroke events. Her 150 yd and 200 m records stood for 11 year and her 100 m world record was not broken for a period of 21 years - the longest a record has ever stood in swimming. In 1971, she was inducted into the International Swimming Hall of Fame.

Notes and references

External links

 

1920 births
2002 deaths
Dutch female backstroke swimmers
European Aquatics Championships medalists in swimming
Swimmers from Rotterdam
20th-century Dutch women